Nordvargr is the most commonly used name for Swedish musician Henrik Nordvargr Björkk.

Background

Early Influence
In the late seventies Björkk became aware of music recorded by bands such as Kiss. After this he began buying music on a regular basis, staying true to the metal scene throughout his early teens. His taste and thoughts changed when he heard the German band Kraftwerk with their electronic sound and cold drum rhythms. When he was 16 he bought a Roland SH-101 synthesiser and began working on music inspired by bands such as DAF and Front 242. This led to Björkk recording with friends producing what would later be the band Pouppée Fabrikk.

Maschinenzimmer 412
In 1988 Nordvargr became part of the influential black industrial combo Maschinenzimmer 412 (later Mz.412). The first album, Malfeitor, was released in 1989 on the Cold Meat Industry label. This first album was limited to seven hundred copies.
Since then, he has systematically explored the broad field of post-industrial music, releasing solo records covering noise, power electronics, militant, dark ambient, drone, blackened noise, experimental and avant garde. In parallel to his band activities, he has pursued a solo career with a vast amount of record releases.

All Hail The Transcending Ghost
In 2009 Nordvargr collaborated with Tim Bertilsson to produce the new project titled All Hail The Transcending Ghost. The album of the same name was released by Cold Spring.

Musical style
Nordvargr's early work was characterised by The Wire as "cultish Dark Ambient", but became more experimental. He has made industrial music (Mz.412), and ambient black metal (Vargr).

Discography

References

External links

 Official website 
 Nordvargr discography at Discogs

Industrial musicians
Noise musicians
Electronic body music musicians
1971 births
Living people
Tumult Records artists